Serge van den Ban (born 2 February 1980), is a Dutch retired football goalkeeper who currently works as a goalkeeping coach at the Arsenal football academy.

Club career
Born in Haarlem, Van den Ban came through the youth ranks at AFC Ajax. He then in 2000 started playing professionally for Haarlem in the Eerste Divisie for two seasons. Subsequently, he went to the Eredivisie with FC Dordrecht who moved to the Eerste Divisie the following season. Van Den Ban in 2004 rejoined the Eredivisie with the outfit MVV Maastricht with whom he got to the quarter finals of the 2006 KNVB Cup

He then moved to Telstar where he featuring once again in the Eerste Divisie within the 2007–08 season. Van Den Ban then linked up a year later with Hoofdklasse team ADO '20. He then signed with outfit Ter Leede in the 2010-11 season of the Hoofdklasse. He brought an end to his player career shortly afterward. Van Den Ban made in all over 250 appearances throughout his footballing club career.

International career
Van den Ban played at youth level for the Netherlands He was also crowned the best goalkeeper of the 1999 Eurovoetbal tournament.

Coaching career
Van Den Ban coached in prior at clubs Ajax, FC Utrecht and AZ Alkmaar together with the Holland's U15 team. He is currently linked up as of July 2015 with English side Arsenal as the goalkeeping coach of the club's Under 6 to Under 16 teams.

Honours

Club honours

Ajax
Eurovoetbal Cup: Winner- 1999

Individual honours
Best Goalkeeper:Eurovoetbal Cup – 1999

References

External links
Profile at Voetbal International

1980 births
Living people
Footballers from Haarlem
Association football goalkeepers
Dutch footballers
Eerste Divisie players
Derde Divisie players
AFC Ajax players
FC Dordrecht players
HFC Haarlem players
MVV Maastricht players
SC Telstar players
ADO '20 players
Ter Leede players